Kristan Frederick Hopkins (born 8 June 1963) is a British Conservative Party politician, who was formerly the Member of Parliament for Keighley in West Yorkshire. Elected in 2010, he served as Vice-Chamberlain of the Household, a government whip. He was previously Parliamentary Under Secretary of State for Department for Communities and Local Government and the former housing minister.  He lost his seat in the 2017 general election.

Military career 
Hopkins served in Kenya, Northern Ireland and Germany as a Private in the Duke of Wellington's Regiment.

Academic career 
According to his CV, on leaving the Army he completed a degree in communications and cultural studies at Leeds University before going on to lecture in media theory, communications and digital media. His CV gives neither dates nor places for any of these activities. He actually studied at Trinity and All Saints College in Horsforth, Leeds (now Leeds Trinity University).  The college's degrees at that time were awarded externally by the University of Leeds.

Political career
Hopkins had stood twice for Parliament before being elected, when he was second to Linda Riordan in the 2005 election for the seat of Halifax, also in West Yorkshire and for the Leeds West Constituency in 2001.

Before his election to Parliament, Hopkins had been a member of Bradford Council since 1998, rising to become the council's deputy leader in 2004 and leader in 2006.

In 2012, Hopkins alleged that some Muslim gangs were targeting young white girls for rape, saying: "if we deny that fact in this House then the BNP and everybody else climbs on board" and suggested that law enforcement was hindered in pursuing them by "political correctness".

In October 2013, Hopkins appointed Minister for Housing. Conservative Party colleague Nadine Dorries called the promotion of Hopkins to a junior ministerial posts "a really awful decision", describing him on Twitter as "one of parliament's slimiest, nastiest MP's". Therese Coffey defended Hopkins, describing him as "authentic and brave"

In the July 2014 reshuffle, Hopkins became minister for local government and adult social care.

Following the May 2015 general election, Hopkins was appointed Vice-Chamberlain of the Household – a senior position within the whips' office. He was a losing candidate in the general election of 8 June 2017. He later became a Special Adviser at the Northern Ireland Office.

References

External links 
Kris Hopkins Official website

1963 births
Living people
Alumni of the University of Leeds
Alumni of Leeds Trinity University
Conservative Party (UK) MPs for English constituencies
UK MPs 2010–2015
UK MPs 2015–2017
Councillors in Bradford
Duke of Wellington's Regiment soldiers
Ministers of State for Housing (UK)
Conservative Party (UK) councillors